Christ Church is an Elim Pentecostal Church in Station Road, Ellesmere Port, Cheshire, England.  The church is recorded in the National Heritage List for England as a designated Grade II listed building.

History

Christ Church was built as an Anglican church in 1869–71, the architects being Penson and Ritchie.  The nave was extended to the west in 1922–25 by Barnish and Grayson. The church was declared redundant on 1 April 1994. The building was bought in 2010 by the Oasis Christian Centre for £25,000.  It was renovated and opened as an Elim Pentecostal Church in March 2011.

Architecture

The church is constructed in sandstone rubble.  Its plan is cruciform consisting of a four bay nave, a chancel, single-bay north and south transepts, and a vestry. On the south side is a tower, with louvred bell openings and a pyramidal spire.  The east window has three lights and contains Geometric tracery.  the nave windows also have three lights, and those in the transepts have two lights. Both the vestry and the transepts are gabled.

External features

The churchyard contains 26 war graves, those of 25 British Army soldiers of World War I, and a Royal Navy seaman of World War II.

See also

Listed buildings in Ellesmere Port

References

Former Church of England church buildings
Grade II listed churches in Cheshire
Gothic Revival church buildings in England
Gothic Revival architecture in Cheshire
19th-century Church of England church buildings
Churches completed in 1925
Ellesmere Port